You Boyz Make Big Noize is the fourteenth and final studio album by the British rock group Slade. It was released on 27 April 1987 and reached No. 98 in the UK charts. The album was largely produced by bassist Jim Lea, although some tracks were produced by John Punter and Roy Thomas Baker. It was the last studio album by the original lineup, prior to their split in 1992.

The US version of the album, which was released on the CBS label, replaced "Fools Go Crazy" with the title track "You Boyz Make Big Noize", which did not appear on the UK/European versions of the original album.

Background
Following Slade's decision to stop touring in 1984, the band continued to record new material. The 1985 album Rogues Gallery had been a hit across Europe but saw only limited success in the UK and US. When the band set out to record their next album in 1986, they hoped to record a hit album that would put Slade back into the public eye. Initially the band hired producer Roy Thomas Baker to produce the album, but the band felt his working methods were too lengthy and expensive. In the end, Baker completed two tracks, John Punter produced another two and Jim Lea finished the rest.

The lead single, "Still The Same" was released in February 1987 and stalled at No. 73. A lack of airplay on Radio One was seen as an important factor for the chart position as the single had been B-Listed and not A-Listed on the radio's playlist. The second single, "That's What Friends Are For" was released a week before the album in April and reached No. 95. The poor chartings saw RCA unwilling to invest large amounts of money into promoting the album, which reached No. 98 in the UK. In July, a non-album single of the same name, "You Boyz Make Big Noize" was released by the band under the Cheapskate label. It was distributed by RCA and reached No. 94. Around the same time, "Ooh La La in L.A." was released from the album in America by CBS and Germany by RCA. The lack of commercial success resulted in the end of the band's contract with RCA. Despite this, the album track "We Won't Give In" was later released on the Cheapskate label as the album's fourth and final single, but only reached No. 121 in the UK.

In a mid-1986 interview, lead vocalist Noddy Holder spoke of the upcoming album: "We've finally got it finished and feel we have some of the best songs we've ever written." Speaking in a late 1987 fan club interview, Lea commented of his production work on the album: "When I listened to You Boyz Make Big Noize, which is the last thing I did, I thought "this really stands up, I can put this on and be proud of it"."

Due to Holder's personal reasons, the idea of touring to promote the album was ruled out. Speaking in a 1987 fan club interview, guitarist Dave Hill said: "We could announce a tour now, but caution tells us that we'd do better to announce one on the back of a hit. We haven't called it a day on the touring and if luck would have it, we could be touring after this LP." Responding to rumours of the band splitting up, Hill replied: "Fans might be feeling a little left out and a bit disappointed, but they've got to understand that 21 years now is a long time to stay together as a group. We are a little older and we are still trying. I think that deep-seatedly within the group, every one of us would play live, but what we are searching for is a way to take us to another stage of success."

Without a contract with a major label, Slade would not record another album again. In 1991, the band recorded two new singles for Polydor, "Radio Wall of Sound" and "Universe", but would split up shortly after in 1992. Drummer Don Powell later recalled of the album: "It wasn't us, there was no identity on that album. It would have been nice for the original band to have gone out with a better album, like the Slade in Flame album or Slayed?. It was like a certain magic was missing. The closeness that we'd had wasn't there."

Recording
You Boyz Make Big Noize was recorded at Wessex Studios, Portland Studios, Redan Studios and Music Works. The album's title was chosen after Betty, a Wessex Studios tea-lady, commented to Slade "you boys make big noise" during a recording session. For the album, Holder and Lea demoed around eighteen tracks, while Hill put forward four of his own demos.

In an early 1987 fan club interview, Powell spoke of the album's completion: "We finished the album yesterday, actually. We spent yesterday piecing it together and sorting out the running order. We know exactly which tracks will be on the album – all of which is new material. The album has taken us a long time to record, especially the tracks that John Punter and Roy produced. We spent the first two days with Roy just trying to get the drum sound as he wanted it. He had forty odd mikes over my kit, and it sounded like thunder in the studios. The album is more of a sing-a-long one, as opposed to a heavy metal album."

In a late 1986 fan club interview, Lea spoke of the band's work with Roy Thomas Baker: "I was out with Roy one night, and he got serious for one moment, and said "The only reason I'm here with you lot is because right now in America all the young bands, certainly in Los Angeles, are searching for the formula that Slade created – commercial songs with that edge, and that sound where it all comes out as one". Roy Thomas Baker was the one who put the word 'producer' on the modern map of production – it was a great compliment from him."

Promotion
The album received little promotion from the label, largely due to the disappointing sales of "Still the Same". No music videos were filmed to promote the singles. In a 1987 fan club interview, Hill discussed the song's failure:

Critical reception

Upon release, Jon Hotten of Kerrang! described the album as having the "unmistakable Slade stamp" with "12 potential singles", and concluded: "If you like Slade, you'll like this, if you don't, then I don't think this is the album to convert you." In America, reviews were generally positive. Billboard recommended the album, describing it as "raucous, guitar-based rock with shout-along choruses". Circus summarised the album as "galvanized stomp-rock" and concluded: "Slade do not write bad songs – every chorus is custom designed singing along in your favorite watering hole; every solo constructed to have even the most jaded listener bobbing his head." Guitar magazine noted that the album "carries on [Slade's] spirit with amazing vibrancy". They concluded: "Holder and Lea are masters of schoolboy hooks, big shouted choruses that anyone can latch onto. No one will ever mistake this for compositional brilliance, but Slade's consistent ability to suck you into their friendly carousing is impressive."

Eric McClary of Reno Gazette-Journal described the album as "good-time music" with "simple unison choruses", "sentimental lyrics" and "lots of optimism". He concluded: "See if you can resist them – I can't." Jim Zebora of Record-Journal summarised: "Perhaps the thing that Slade does best and what makes their playing so entertaining is the mixture of rocking sincerity and good humor about what it all means. "Sing Shout (Knock Yourself Out)" describes this philosophy in song, and boy does it make you want to move. If this were a just world, Slade would still be making hit records. That they're not just doesn't seem to be their fault." Cash Box listed the album as one of their "feature picks" during August 1987. They noted the album "pulls no punches with Noddy Holder belting out the melodic stompers".

AllMusic retrospectively reviewed the album, which concluded: "Every track here stomps out a variation on the Slade theme of "Sing Shout (Knock Yourself Out)." AC/DC stole Slade's shtick all those years ago and now can't write its way out of a six pack, while these crazee boyz are still having fun slinging crisp chops and heavy hooks. Kudos. That's what Slade is for." Joe Geesin of the webzine Get Ready to Rock felt the album has "some good moments", but added "most of the album is mediocre at best". He added: "The anthemic big choruses just weren't as catchy. Plenty of keyboards, layering and whatever just wasn't Slade."

Track listing

Chart performance

Personnel
Slade
Noddy Holder – lead vocals, rhythm guitar
Dave Hill – lead guitar, backing vocals
Jim Lea – bass guitar, keyboards, guitars, backing vocals, producer, arranger
Don Powell – drums, percussion

Additional personnel
John Punter – producer (tracks 3, 8)
Roy Thomas Baker – producer (tracks 1–2)
Gerrard Johnson, Pete Hammond – keyboard programming
Dave Garland, Jerry Napier, Mark Dearney, Matt Butler, Trevor Hallesey – engineers

References

Slade albums
1987 albums
Albums produced by Jim Lea
Albums produced by Roy Thomas Baker
Albums produced by John Punter
RCA Records albums
CBS Records albums